Aeroflot Flight 773 was a scheduled domestic Soviet Union passenger flight from Moscow to Simferopol that crashed following a bomb explosion on 10 October 1971.

Aircraft
The aircraft involved was a Tupolev Tu-104B registered as СССР-42390 to the Ukraine Civil Aviation Directorate of Aeroflot. At the time of the accident, the aircraft had endured 13,062 flight hours and 10,452 pressurization cycles.

Crew
Seven crew members were aboard the flight. The cockpit crew consisted of:
Captain Konstantin Romanovich Klyushnik
Co-pilot Anatoly Yefimovich Vorobevsky
Navigator Vladimir Alekseevich Solodyannikov
Flight engineer Valentin Alekseevich Bezrodny
Radio operator Viktor Ivanovich Obedkov 
The two flight attendants consisted of Svetlana Vladimirovna Papushina and Boris Nesterovich Marchenko.

A policeman was also on board, but was counted as a passenger in the report.

Synopsis
The aircraft arrived at Moscow from Simferopol at 19:02, after which the aircraft was prepared for the return trip to Simferopol. Weather conditions at the time were overcast with low clouds and a visibility of 6 kilometers. Flight 773 took off from Vnukovo Airport at 20:16. Thirty-one seconds later the crew contacted air traffic control and reported that they were heading for Chornaya Gryaz. The controller contacted Flight 773 asking them if they had passed through , but the crew did not respond. The controller repeatedly attempted to contact the crew, but there was no response.

Just seconds after the crew reported to the controller about the takeoff, an explosion ripped through the aircraft. The left side of the fuselage was torn open and the left wing was severely damaged. The aircraft began rolling to the right with a loss of altitude. At  the aircraft broke up and some passenger seats fell out. All 25 people on board died, including film actress Raisa Zverev.

Investigation
An investigation showed that debris that fell from the aircraft before the crash showed signs of fire damage. Fragments of TNT were also found. It was concluded that the explosion was the result of a bomb that was located in the luggage compartment, however it was later revealed that a bomb of 400-800 grams of TNT was placed on the cabin floor, between the cabin wall and a seat at frame 43. The investigation finished in 1973 without finding the suspect who placed the bomb.

References

External links
Accident description at the Aviation Safety Network

Unsolved airliner bombings
Aviation accidents and incidents in 1971
Aviation accidents and incidents in the Soviet Union
773
1971 in the Soviet Union
Accidents and incidents involving the Tupolev Tu-104
October 1971 events in Europe
Mass murder in 1971
Terrorist incidents in the Soviet Union